Febrifugum may refer to:

Gymnostachyum febrifugum
Psorospermum febrifugum